

Bluejacking is the sending of unsolicited messages over Bluetooth to Bluetooth-enabled devices such as mobile phones, PDAs or laptop computers, sending a vCard which typically contains a message in the name field (i.e., for bluedating) to another Bluetooth-enabled device via the OBEX protocol.  

Origins
Bluejacking was reportedly first carried out between 2001 and 2003 by a Malaysian IT consultant who used his phone to advertise Ericsson to a single Nokia 7650 phone owner in a Malaysian bank. He also invented the name, which he claims is an amalgam of Bluetooth and ajack, his username on Esato, a Sony Ericsson fan online forum. Jacking is, however, an extremely common shortening of "hijack', the act of taking over something. Ajack's original posts are hard to find, but references to the exploit are common in 2003 posts.

Another user on the forum claims earlier discovery, reporting a near-identical story to that attributed to Ajack, except they describe bluejacking 44 Nokia 7650 phones instead of one, and the location is a garage, seemingly in Denmark, rather than a Malaysian Bank.  Also, the message was an insult to Nokia owners rather than a Sony Ericsson advertisement.

Usage
Bluejacking is usually not very harmful, except that bluejacked people generally don't know what has happened, and so may think that their phone is malfunctioning. Usually, a bluejacker will only send a text message, but with modern phones it's possible to send images or sounds as well. Bluejacking has been used in guerrilla marketing campaigns to promote advergames.

Bluejacking is also confused with Bluesnarfing, which is the way in which mobile phones are illegally hacked via Bluetooth.

Companies

BluejackQ
BlueJackQ is a website dedicated to bluejacking. The website contains a few bluejacking stories taken from the site's forum. The website also includes software that can be used for bluejacking and guides on how to bluejack which are slightly out of date but the basic principle still applies to most makes of phone. Its forum has 4,000 registered users and 93,050 posts. The website has been featured in many news articles.

The forums  were opened on the November 13, 2003 and has been the center of BluejackQ from the start. It currently has 4 moderators and has 20 different sections available to members. The areas included information about BluejackQ, reviews of mobile phones, media players, PDAs and Miscellaneous devices, general bluejacking threads and an off-topic area. The BluejackQ podcast was first released as a test version on January 15, 2006, thus becoming the first bluejacking-related podcast. Podcasts 1, 2 and 3 featured three members of the forums.

Fictional reference in Person of Interest 

The authentic bluejacking as described here is not the same exploit which was frequently depicted in the television series Person of Interest; that fictional exploit portrayed different and more invasive capabilities.

See also 
 Bluebugging
Bluesnarfing
 AirDrop

References

Bluetooth
Spamming